Alana Dalzell (born 26 March 2001) is a Northern Irish cricketer who plays as a right-handed batter and right-arm medium bowler. She was named in Ireland's squad for their series against South Africa in June 2022, and made her Women's One Day International (WODI) debut, against South Africa, on 14 June. She became the first player from the North West of Ireland to play a WODI since Julie Logue in 1996.

Dalzell has played in the Women's Super Series since 2020, playing for Scorchers in 2020 and 2021 before joining Dragons in 2022. She plays club cricket for Bready Cricket Club.

References

External links
 
 

2001 births
Living people
Sportspeople from Derry (city)
Irish women cricketers
Ireland women One Day International cricketers
Scorchers (women's cricket) cricketers
Dragons (women's cricket) cricketers